United Nations Security Council resolution 483, adopted on 17 December 1980, after recalling resolutions 425 (1978), 426 (1978), 427 (1978), 434 (1978), 444 (1979), 450 (1979), 459 (1979), 467 (1980) and 474 (1980) and considering the report from the Secretary-General on the United Nations Interim Force in Lebanon (UNIFIL), the Council noted the continuing need for the Force given the situation between Israel and Lebanon.

The resolution went on to extend the mandate of UNIFIL until 19 June 1981, commending the work the Force had done in the area, and in relation to the General Armistice Agreement and the reactivation of the Mixed Armistice Commissions.

Resolution 483 was adopted by 12 votes to none, while East Germany and the Soviet Union abstained, and China did not participate.

See also
 Blue Line
 Israeli–Lebanese conflict
 List of United Nations Security Council Resolutions 401 to 500 (1976–1982)

References
Text of the Resolution at undocs.org

External links
 

 0483
Israeli–Lebanese conflict
 0483
1980 in Israel
 0483
December 1980 events